Donillas is a locality and minor local entity located in the municipality of Quintana del Castillo, in León province, Castile and León, Spain. As of 2020, it has a population of 44.

Geography 
Donillas is located 49km west of León, Spain.

References

Populated places in the Province of León